The National Audit Department is an independent government agency in Malaysia that is responsible for carrying out the audits on the accounts of Federal Government, State Government and Federal Statutory Bodies as well as the activities of the Ministry/Department/Agency and Companies under the Federal and State Government.

See also
 Auditor General of Malaysia
 Public Accounts Committee (Malaysia)

External links

Malaysia
Government audit agencies in Malaysia
Government agencies established in 1906
Federal ministries, departments and agencies of Malaysia
Prime Minister's Department (Malaysia)
Supreme audit institutions
1906 establishments in British Malaya